Oscar Leonardo Torres Parra (August 29, 1995 – September 17, 2017), better known by his ring name Rey Celestial, was a Mexican luchador, a masked professional wrestler best known for his time working in Lucha Libre AAA Worldwide. In 2012, he was one of the winners of their talent search show ¿Quién Pinta para la Corona? which led to him working several TV-shows for the promotion.   However he spent most of his career working in the promotion Desastre Total Ultraviolento (DTU).

In 2017 he signed a contract with The Crash Lucha Libre, and worked his first show for the promotion in San Luis Potosí five days prior to his death.

On September 17, 2017, Rey Celestial was killed in a hit and run incident while out walking in his hometown of Puebla. He was survived by his wife, Consejo Mundial de Lucha Libre wrestler, La Magnifica, and their young son. He was honored by his previous employer, Lucha Libre AAA Worldwide.

References

External links 
Tribute video of Rey Celestial's in-ring career (Youtube)

1995 births
2017 deaths
Masked wrestlers
Mexican male professional wrestlers
Professional wrestlers from Puebla
People from Puebla
Road incident deaths in Mexico
Pedestrian road incident deaths